Thomas Elrington or Elderton (?1520–1566) was an English politician.

He was a Member (MP) of the Parliament of England for New Shoreham in October 1553 and Bramber in November 1554.

References

1520 births
1566 deaths
English MPs 1553 (Mary I)
English MPs 1554–1555